Bothriembryon is a genus of tropical air-breathing land snails, terrestrial pulmonate gastropod mollusks in the family Bothriembryontidae.

B. J. Smith (1992) made the last review of the genus summarizing all known data.

Distribution 
The land snail genus Bothriembryon is endemic to Australia but forms part of the Gondwanan element in the superfamily Orthalicoidea. Bothriembryon species are mostly patchy in their distribution.

Taxonomy 
This genus was classified with the Bulimulidae by Pilsbry (1900), Breure (1979) and by B. J. Smith (1992).

It was classified in tribe Bulimulini, in subfamily Bulimulinae within the family Orthalicidae according to the taxonomy of the Gastropoda by Bouchet & Rocroi, 2005.

Breure et al. (2010) moved Bothriembryon to Placostylidae.

Breure & Romero (2012) confirmed previous results from 2010 and they renamed Placostylidae to Bothriembryontidae.

Species
Species within the genus Bothriembryon include:

 Bothriembryon angasianus (Pfeiffer, 1864)
 Bothriembryon balteolus Iredale, 1939
 Bothriembryon barretti Iredale, 1930
 Bothriembryon bradshaweri Iredale, 1939
 Bothriembryon brazieri (Angas, 1871)
 Bothriembryon bulla (Menke, 1843)
 † Bothriembryon consors Kendrick, 1978
 Bothriembryon costulatus (Lamarck, 1822)
 † Bothriembryon douglasi Kendrick, 1978
 Bothriembryon dux (Pfeiffer, 1861)
 Bothriembryon esperantia Iredale, 1939
 Bothriembryon fuscus Thiele, 1930
 † Bothriembryon gardneri Kendrick, 1978
 Bothriembryon glauerti Iredale, 1939
 † Bothriembryon gunnii (Sowerby II in Strzelecki, 1845)
 Bothriembryon indutus (Menke, 1843) 
 Bothriembryon irvineanus Iredale, 1939
 Bothriembryon jacksoni Iredale, 1939
 Bothriembryon kendricki Hill, Johnson & Merrifield, 1983
 Bothriembryon kingii (J. E. Gray, 1825)
 † Bothriembryon kremnobates Kendrick, 2005
 Bothriembryon leeuwinensis (E. A. Smith, 1894)
 Bothriembryon mastersi (Cox, 1867)
 Bothriembryon melo (Quoy & Gaimard, 1832) - synonym: Bothriembryon inflatus castaneus Pilsbry 1900
 Bothriembryon naturalistarum Kobelt, 1901
 Bothriembryon notatus Iredale, 1939
 Bothriembryon onslowi (Cox, 1864)
 Bothriembryon perditus Iredale, 1939
 Bothriembryon perobesus Iredale, 1939
 Bothriembryon praecelcus Iredale, 1939
 † Bothriembryon praecursor McMichael, 1968
 Bothriembryon revectus Iredale, 1939
 Bothriembryon rhodostomus (J. E. Gray, 1834)
 Bothriembryon richeanus Iredale, 1939
 † Bothriembryon ridei Kendrick, 1978
 Bothriembryon sayi (Pfeiffer,  1847)
 Bothriembryon sedgwicki Iredale, 1939
 Bothriembryon serpentinus Iredale, 1939
 Bothriembryon sophiarum Whisson & Breure, 2016
 Bothriembryon spenceri (Tate, 1894)
 Bothriembryon tasmanicus (Pfeiffer, 1853)
 Bothriembryon whitleyi Iredale, 1939
 Bothriembryon gratwicki Cox, 1899 - the taxonomic status of this species status is unclear

References
This article incorporates CC-BY-3.0 text from the reference

External links 
 

Bothriembryontidae
Taxonomy articles created by Polbot